Bozcaada is a municipality in Çanakkale Province, Turkey. It is the seat of and coterminous with the Bozcaada District, which covers the North Aegean island of Bozcaada and a number of islets around it. Its area is 37 km2, and its population is 3,120 (2022). Its mayor is Hakan Can Yılmaz (CHP), and its kaymakam (district governor) is Muhammet Mustafa Kara.

Geography 

Bozcaada district covers the Bozcaada island  and a total of 17 islets around the main island in the Aegean Sea. It is situated 22 km. (12 Nautical miles) south of Dardanelles Strait (Çanakkale Boğazı) Its distance to Geyikli the nearest sea port on the main land (Anatolia) is 7.5 km ( 4.5 nautical miles). Up until recently, Bozcaada was unique in Turkey as being a district with no rural population. (Because of metropolitan municipalities established after the 1980s there are now some other districts with no rural population.)

Population

History

In the antiquity the island was known as Leukophrys and in Greek mythology it was Tenedos. It was mentioned in Homer's Iliad. In the medieval age it was a Byzantine possession. Towards the end of the medieval age it was left to Republic of Venice by the emperor John V Palaiologos as a ransom. In 1381 however, following Venetian Genoese War it was evacuated by the Venetians according to the Peace of Turin. In 1455 it was annexed by the Ottoman Empire during the reign of Mehmet II. Although the Venetians tried to regain the island, in 1464 the Ottoman control was secured by Mahmut Pasha. As a result of the former evacuation, the island was uninhabited during the early years of Ottoman administration and the Ottoman Empire populated the present Bozcaada district by using tax exemption. Ottoman Empire also restored the castle  which was demolished during the Venetian-Genoese war. Turks called the island Bozcaada meaning grayish island and the famous cartographer Piri Reis of the 16th century also used this name in his maps. In 1923 when the Turkish Republic was proclaimed, the island was declared a district and the only settlement in Bozcaada became the municipality and district center of Çanakkale Province.

Economy

The major economic activities of Bozcaada are tourism, wineries, and fishing, with tourism as the dominant economic sector. More than 1.5 million tourists visited Bozccaada in 2018, driven in part by an increased presence in the global media.

Places of interest
According to municipality of Bozcaada the historically important buildings are the following
Bozcaada Castle which was reconstructed by the Ottoman sultan Mehmet II in the 15th century,  and repaired by the Ottoman sultan Mahmut II in 1815  is the most important touristic attraction of Bozcaada. It is in the district center facing east. Thus visitors to Bozcaada can observe the castle during their voyage. 
Another castle is a casemate which is popularly called Yenikale ("new castle"). Despite its name it is in ruins. It  was constructed in 1827 by Hafız Ali Pasha, the governor of Bozcaada. It is situated on a hill to the west of Bozacaada district center 
Alaybey mosque was probably built in 1700 by Ahmet Ağa, the governor of Bozcaada. It is partially in ruins.
Yalı camii is a mosque which was built  on the foundations of a medieval Venetian building in 1655. It was commissioned by Köprülü Mehmet Pasha (future grand vizier) in 1655. It is now under restoration.
Namazgah fountain (with cistern)  was built in 1703. 
Kimisis Teodoku (St Mary) church was built in 1869.
The monastery of Aya Paraskevi

Sister cities
 Valu lui Traian, Romania 
 Gols, Austria

References

External links
For images

Bozcaada district
Districts of Çanakkale Province
Tenedos
Aegean Sea